There have been two baronetcies created for people with the surname Heathcote, both in the Baronetage of Great Britain and both created in 1733. The holders of the first creation were later elevated to the peerage as Baron Aveland and Earl of Ancaster, which titles are now extinct. However, both baronetcies are extant .

The Heathcote Baronetcy, of London, was created in the Baronetage of Great Britain on 17 January 1733 for Gilbert Heathcote, Lord Mayor of London in 1711 and one of the founders of the Bank of England. His son, the second Baronet, represented Grantham and Bodmin in the House of Commons. He was succeeded by his son, the third Baronet, who sat as a Member of Parliament for Shaftesbury. His son, the fourth Baronet, represented Lincolnshire and Rutland in Parliament as a Whig. On his death the titles passed to his son, the fifth Baronet. He sat as a Member of Parliament for Boston, South Lincolnshire and Rutland and served as Lord Lieutenant of Lincolnshire. In 1856 he was created Baron Aveland, of Aveland in the County of Lincoln, in the Peerage of the United Kingdom. Lord Aveland married Clementina Drummond-Willoughby, 24th Baroness Willoughby de Eresby (a descendant of the Dukes of Ancaster and Kesteven). They were both succeeded by their son, the second and twenty-fifth Baron respectively. In 1872 he assumed by Royal licence the additional surnames of Willoughby and Drummond. Lord Aveland represented Boston and Rutland in the House of Commons as a Liberal. In 1892 the Ancaster title held by his maternal ancestors was revived when he was made Earl of Ancaster, in the County of Lincoln. He was succeeded by his son, the second Earl. He sat as a Member of Parliament for Horncastle and served as Lord Lieutenant of Rutland.

His son, the third Earl, represented Rutland and Stamford in the House of Commons and served as Lord Lieutenant of Lincolnshire. In 1951 he was summoned to the House of Lords through a writ in acceleration in his father's junior title of Baron Willoughby de Eresby. He succeeded his father later that year. His only son and heir Timothy, Lord Willoughby de Eresby, went missing at sea in 1963. As a result, on Lord Ancaster's death in 1983 the barony of Aveland and earldom became extinct while he was succeeded in the barony of Willoughby de Eresby by his daughter Nancy. The Heathcote Baronetcy also survived, and was inherited by the late Earl's kinsman, the ninth Baronet. He was a descendant of Robert Heathcote, third son of the third Baronet, and was a Brigadier in the British Army.  He was succeeded by his son when he died at the age of 100 in 2014. The holder of the Earldom of Ancaster was the senior holder of the Lord Great Chamberlainship. The Hon. Claud Heathcote-Drummond-Willoughby, second son of the first Earl of Ancaster, was a Conservative politician.

The Heathcote Baronetcy, of Hursley in the County of Southampton, was created in the Baronetage of Great Britain on 16 August 1733 for William Heathcote. He represented Buckingham and Southampton in the House of Commons. The third Baronet sat as a Member of Parliament for Hampshire. The fourth Baronet represented Hampshire in Parliament as a Conservative. He assumed the additional surname of Freeman. The fifth Baronet was a Conservative Member of Parliament for Hampshire, North Hampshire and Oxford University and was admitted to the Privy Council in 1870. The ninth Baronet was Anglican Bishop of New Westminster in British Columbia.  Henry Heathcote, fourth son of the third baronet, received a knighthood and became an admiral in the Royal Navy, while Gilbert Heathcote, youngest son of the third baronet, also had a naval career, becoming a post-captain.

The first Baronet married Lady Elizabeth Parker, only daughter of Thomas Parker, 1st Earl of Macclesfield. The earldom of Macclesfield and its subsidiary title the viscountcy of Parker had been created with remainder, in default of male issue, to the Earl's daughter Elizabeth and the heirs male of her body. As a result, all male-line descendants of Sir William Heathcote and Lady Elizabeth, including the present Baronet, are in special remainder to these peerages.

Heathcote baronets, of London (1733)

Sir Gilbert Heathcote, 1st Baronet (1652–1733)
Sir John Heathcote, 2nd Baronet (1689–1759)
Sir Gilbert Heathcote, 3rd Baronet (died 1785)
Sir Gilbert Heathcote, 4th Baronet (1773–1851)
Sir Gilbert John Heathcote, 5th Baronet (1795–1867) (created Baron Aveland in 1856)

Barons Aveland (1856)
Gilbert John Heathcote, 1st Baron Aveland (1795–1867)
Gilbert Henry Heathcote-Drummond-Willoughby, 2nd Baron Aveland (1830–1910) (created Earl of Ancaster in 1892)

Earls of Ancaster (1892)
Gilbert Henry Heathcote-Drummond-Willoughby, 1st Earl of Ancaster (1830–1910)
Gilbert Heathcote-Drummond-Willoughby, 2nd Earl of Ancaster (1867–1951)
Gilbert James Heathcote-Drummond-Willoughby, 3rd Earl of Ancaster (1907–1983)
Timothy Gilbert Heathcote-Drummond-Willoughby, Lord Willoughby de Eresby (1936–1963)

Heathcote baronets, of London (1733; reverted)
Sir Gilbert Simon Heathcote, 9th Baronet (1913–2014)
Sir Mark Simon Robert Heathcote, 10th Baronet (born 1941)

The heir apparent to the baronetcy is the eldest son of the 10th Baronet, Alistair Robert Heathcote (born 1977).

Heathcote baronets, of Hursley (1733)

Sir William Heathcote, 1st Baronet (1693–1751)
Sir Thomas Heathcote, 2nd Baronet (1721–1787)
Sir William Heathcote, 3rd Baronet (1746–1819)
Sir Thomas Freeman-Heathcote, 4th Baronet (1769–1825)
Sir William Heathcote, 5th Baronet (1801–1881)
Sir William Perceval Heathcote, 6th Baronet (1826–1903)
Sir William Arthur Heathcote, 7th Baronet (1853–1924)
Sir Gilbert Redvers Heathcote, 8th Baronet (1854–1937)
Sir Francis Cooke Caulfeild Heathcote, 9th Baronet (1868–1961)
Sir Leonard Vyvyan Heathcote, 10th Baronet (1885–1963)
Sir Michael Perryman Heathcote, 11th Baronet (1927–2007)
Sir Timothy Gilbert Heathcote, 12th Baronet (born 1957)

See also
Heathcoat-Amory baronets
Baron Willoughby de Eresby
Duke of Ancaster and Kesteven
Earl of Lindsey
Earl of Macclesfield (1721 creation)

References

External links

Kidd, Charles, Williamson, David (editors). Debrett's Peerage and Baronetage (1990 edition). New York: St Martin's Press, 1990, 

Heathcote
1733 establishments in Great Britain